Kungur is a rural locality (a village) in Vereshchaginsky District, Perm Krai, Russia.  The population was 3 as of 2010.

Geography 
Kungur is located 26 km east of Vereshchagino (the district's administrative centre) by road. Pogorelka is the nearest rural locality.

References 

Rural localities in Vereshchaginsky District